The Institute Of Medical Sciences (IMS-BHU) is one of the Six institutes of Banaras Hindu University in Varanasi, India and comprises three faculties, Faculty of Medicine, Dental Sciences, and Ayurveda.

The Institute of Medical Sciences is the medical school of the university. Like other institutions forming BHU, it is residential and co-educational.

History
The Institute started functioning as College of Medical Sciences in 1960 with nine departments of Modern Medicine and eight departments of Ayurveda, under the leadership of K. N. Udupa, the Founder Director of the institute.

In 1971, the College of Medical Sciences, was upgraded to Institute of Medical Sciences. Today it has 33 departments of Modern Medicine including 10 Departments of Super-specialties, four Departments of dentistry, eleven Departments of Ayurveda and a school of Nursing.

Academics
The institute is affiliated to Banaras Hindu University and offers medical and paramedical courses at the undergraduate and postgraduate levels. Admission in  BAMS, MBBS and BDS courses is on the basis of merit through NEET. Admission in  Nursing courses is through exams conducted on university level. It has 45 departments under three faculties.

Campus

The campus of IMS lies at the front part of university. The campus contains the medical college, the hospital, the student and resident hostels, the staff quarters, a post office, a temple (BHU Vishwanathji), playgrounds and sporting fields. While the hospital section of the campus is typically crowded and busy, the residential part of the campus is quiet and idyllic punctuated with small parks.

Organization
IMS is not under the direct administrative control of the  Ministry of Health and Family Welfare, Government of India, but under Banaras Hindu University, an autonomous central university. The three functions of the institute are to impart quality education in undergraduate and postgraduate medical and paramedical courses, to be a trend-setter in medical research and to offer patient care of high order.

The institute is headed by the Director as the chief executive charged with responsibility of running the institute and the hospital. The Deans of the faculties help the Director in coordinating academic activities of the institute, including teaching and research. There are 28 academic departments headed by the Heads of the Departments. Ancillary hospital service is under the direct supervision of the Medical Superintendent with the individual units supervised by technical heads.

Rankings

The IMS-BHU was ranked fifth among medical college in India in the National Institutional Ranking Framework 2022,  sixth in 2021 by India Today and second in 2021 by Outlook India.

Student life
The campus has three hostels for undergraduate men named Punarvasu Atrey Hostel, Ruiya Medical Hostel and Dhanwntri Hostel, and four hostels for postgraduate men named Old P. G. Hostel, New P.G. Hostel, Sushruta hostel Ruiya Annexe. and Married Doctors Hostel. Undergraduate and postgraduate women live in Kasturba Girls Hostel. All hostels run their own messes.

Awards and Medals 

 Bhagwandas Thakurdas Chandwani Gold Medal is given to the student standing first in MBBS at the IMS-BHU.

Student activities
The inter-collegiate cultural, literary and sports festival of IMS is called Elixir and is held in mid-March every year. Both the undergraduate men's hostels and the undergraduate women's hostel hold annual hostel days.

Notable alumni

 Sumita Prabhakar
 Sapam Budhichandra Singh
 Radha Mohan Das Agarwal
 Mohamed Ayub
 Ram Harsh Singh

Upgradation
Government of India had decided to upgrade the institute on lines of All India Institute of Medical Sciences as part of phase-1 of Pradhan Mantri Swasthya Suraksha Yojana (PMSSY) whereby the Central Government will bear 80% of the cost of up gradation and 20% cost will be borne by State Government. The up-gradation work is complete.

See also
List of educational institutions in Varanasi

References

External links 
 

Colleges in India
Medical colleges in Uttar Pradesh
Banaras Hindu University
Universities and colleges in Varanasi
Universities and colleges in Uttar Pradesh
Educational institutions established in 1960
1960 establishments in Uttar Pradesh